These are some notable tornadoes, tornado outbreaks, and tornado outbreak sequences that have occurred around the globe.

 Exact death and injury counts are not possible; especially for large events and events before 1955.
 Prior to 1950 in the United States, only significant tornadoes are listed for the number of tornadoes in outbreaks.
 Due to increasing detection, particularly in the U.S., numbers of counted tornadoes have increased markedly in recent decades although the number of actual tornadoes and counted significant tornadoes has not. In older events, the number of tornadoes officially counted is likely underestimated.

By continent

Africa

Asia

Europe

North America

Oceania

South America

Tornadoes by year 
 See List of tornado events by year
Currently 1946–Present

Tornadoes by day of year 
 See List of tornadoes by calendar day

Tornadoes striking the downtown central business district of major cities 
 See List of tornadoes striking downtown areas of large cities

Tornadoes rated F5 and EF5 
 See List of F5 and EF5 tornadoes

Tornadoes rated F4 and EF4 
 See List of F4 and EF4 tornadoes
 See List of F4 and EF4 tornadoes (2010–2019)
 See List of F4 and EF4 tornadoes (2020–present)

Tornadoes causing 100 or more deaths 
 See: List of tornadoes causing 100 or more deaths

Tornado-related deaths at schools 
 See List of tornado-related deaths at schools

Tornadoes spawned by tropical cyclones 
 See List of tornadoes spawned by tropical cyclones

Tornadoes with confirmed satellite tornadoes 
 See List of tornadoes with confirmed satellite tornadoes

See also 

 List of 21st-century Canadian tornadoes and tornado outbreaks
 List of derecho events
 List of tropical cyclones
 Tornado climatology
 Tornado intensity
 Tornado myths
 Tornado records

References 
 Grazulis, Thomas P. (1993). Significant Tornadoes 1680-1991, A Chronology and Analysis of Events. St. Johnsbury, VT: The Tornado Project of Environmental Films. 
 --- (1997). Significant Tornadoes Update, 1992-1995. 
 --- (2001). The Tornado: Nature's Ultimate Windstorm. Norman, OK: University of Oklahoma Press. 
 National Oceanic and Atmospheric Administration, National Climatic Data Center / Storm Prediction Center. Storm Data.

External links 
Significant events
 Websites Dedicated to Specific Tornado Events (SPC, NOAA)
 World Wide Tornadoes (Tornado Project)
 UK/European Tornado Extremes  (TORRO)
 Tornadoes in Germany (in German)
 Tornado Map (German Project / Map Worldwide)
 Tornadoes in Brazil 
 Czech and Slovakia Tornadoes (in Czech) (Czech Hydrometeorological Institute)
 Tornadoes in Italy (* in Italian)

Tornado event data
 Searchable Database of All US Tornadoes From 1950-present
 Preliminary storm (tornadoes, severe wind and hail) reports from June 1, 1999 to present; and severe storm climatology information (SPC)
 Daily Severe Weather Report Archive from 1985-1999 (SPC)
 NCDC's searchable Storm Data database
 Storm Data publication (NCDC) (purchase required)
 STORM NEWS and Archives (Sam Barricklow, K5kJ)
 Storm Report Map (SPC storm reports overlaid on Google Maps)
 European Severe Storms Laboratory (ESSL)
 European Severe Weather Database (ESWD)
 Center of Competence for Severe Local Storms in Germany, Austria, and Switzerland (TorDACH)
 European Climatology on Severe Storms (University of the Balearic Islands)

Miscellaneous
 Online Severe Weather Climatology for weather radar coverage areas (SPC)
 Severe Thunderstorm Climatology (NSSL)
 The Tornado Project
 NCDC Tornado Statistics and Data
 Historical Tornado Data Archive, 1950-2007 (SPC)
 Tornadoes of Bangladesh and eastern India by Jonathon D. Finch, M.S. (with additional global tornado information)
 European Storm Forecast Experiment (ESTOFEX)
 Skywarn Europe
 Extreme Weather Source Book -- Economic and Other Societal Impacts Related to Hurricanes, Floods, Tornadoes, Lightning, and Other U.S. Weather Phenomena (University of Colorado at Boulder)
 Tornado History Project Searchable US tornado database overlaid on a Google Map

Weather data archives
 Severe Thunderstorm Events (SPC)
 Various (NCDC)
 Various (Plymouth State University)
 Various (Iowa State University)
 Radar and weather data (McGill University)
 Satellite data (University of Wisconsin–Madison)
 Upper air soundings (University of Wyoming)